Zetela annectens is a species of sea snail, a marine gastropod mollusk in the family Solariellidae, the top snails.

Distribution
This marine species is endemic to New Zealand and occurs off the Great Barrier Island at depths between 486 m and 655 m.

References

 Marshall, B.A. 1999: A revision of the Recent Solariellinae (Gastropoda: Trochoidea) of the New Zealand region. The Nautilus 113: 4-42

External links

annectens
Gastropods of New Zealand
Gastropods described in 1999